Harris Building may refer to:

in Australia
Harris Building (Burnie), Tasmania

in the United States
Harris Building (Dayton, Oregon), listed on the NRHP in Yamhill County, Oregon
Harris Building (Philadelphia, Pennsylvania), NRHP-listed

See also
Harris House (disambiguation)
Harrison Building (disambiguation)